Cape Rymill is a steep, metamorphic rock cliff standing opposite the central part of Hearst Island and jutting out from the icecap along the east coast of Palmer Land. Named for John Rymill by members of the East Base of the United States Antarctic Service (USAS) who charted this coast by land and from the air in 1940. Rymill was the leader of the British Graham Land Expedition (BGLE), and in 1936 sledged eastward across Antarctic Peninsula to 6945S, 6328W.
 

Headlands of Palmer Land